

The Teledyne Ryan Model 410 was a surveillance UAV designed in the United States in the late 1980s. In configuration, it was a high-wing cantilever monoplane with twin tails carried on booms and linked by a common horizontal stabilizer. The engine was mounted pusher-fashion at the rear of the fuselage, between the booms. The nosewheel of the tricycle undercarriage was retractable. Construction throughout was of composite materials.

In 1993, the Model 410 was submitted to the UAV Joint Projects Office in response to a RFP for a Tier II system. In January 1994, the contract was awarded to General Atomics for what would eventually become the RQ-1 Predator.

Specifications

Notes

References
 
 
 
 
 

1980s United States military reconnaissance aircraft
Unmanned aerial vehicles of the United States
Ryan aircraft